The Mill Creek Canyon Earthworks is a public park, storm water detention dam and Modernist "masterpiece" of environmental art located in Kent, Washington, United States. The earthworks was created by Bauhaus artist Herbert Bayer in 1982 and designated a landmark by King County Landmarks Commission in 2008.

See also
Robert Morris Earthwork

References

External links
Earthworks: Art & Landscape in the Green River Valley at City of Kent
Mill Creek Canyon Earthworks at The Cultural Landscape Foundation
Herbert Bayer: Mill Creek Canyon Earthworks at King County Cultural Services

Buildings and structures in Kent, Washington
Environmental art
Landmarks in King County, Washington
Parks in Kent, Washington
Dams in Washington (state)